Iowa Highway 144 (Iowa 144) is a state highway in central Iowa. It begins in Perry at an intersection with Iowa Highway 141, while it ends at an intersection with Iowa Highway 175 between Gowrie and Harcourt.

Route description

Iowa Highway 144 begins at Iowa Highway 141 in the southern part of Perry.  Iowa 144 heads north along First Street where it intersects Willis Avenue, a former alignment of Iowa 141 before it became an expressway.  North of Perry, Iowa 144 enters Boone County for just under .  The Boone County stretch of Iowa 144 is predominantly east–west, while the rest of the highway is north–south.

In Greene County, Iowa 144 turns to the northwest, along an abandoned railroad line, and goes through Rippey.  Three miles northwest of Rippey, the highway turns to the north and travels another three miles to Grand Junction.  At Grand Junction, Iowa 144 crosses the main Union Pacific Railroad line before intersecting U.S. Highway 30 on the northern side of town.  North of Grand Junction, Iowa 144 continues north through Dana and passes near Paton before ending at Iowa Highway 175 halfway between Gowrie and Harcourt.

History
Iowa Highway 144, upon creation in 1926, only went between Grand Junction and what was then Iowa Highway 47 (modern Iowa Highway 175).  In 1941 the segment south from Grand Junction to Perry was added.  In 1980, the segment in Webster County was decommissioned, but was recommissioned in 1982.

Major intersections

References

External links

End of Iowa 144 at Iowa Highway Ends

144